Dmitry Lisitsyn is a Russian environmentalist. He was awarded the Goldman Environmental Prize in 2011, for his efforts on protection of the ecosystems of the island of Sakhalin.

References 

Date of birth unknown
Living people
Russian environmentalists
Goldman Environmental Prize awardees
Year of birth missing (living people)